Wabash Township, Indiana may refer to one of the following places:

 Wabash Township, Adams County, Indiana
 Wabash Township, Fountain County, Indiana
 Wabash Township, Gibson County, Indiana
 Wabash Township, Jay County, Indiana
 Wabash Township, Parke County, Indiana
 Wabash Township, Tippecanoe County, Indiana

See also

Wabash Township (disambiguation)

Indiana township disambiguation pages